The Mitchell–Lama Housing Program is a non-subsidy governmental housing guarantee in the state of New York. It was sponsored by New York State Senator MacNeil Mitchell and Assemblyman Alfred Lama.  It was signed into law in 1955 as The Limited-Profit Housing Companies Act (officially contained in the Private Housing Finance law, article II titled Limited-Profit Housing Companies and referring to not-for-profit corp., whereas article IV titled Limited Dividend Housing Companies refers to non-Mitchell–Lama affordable housing organized as business corp., partnerships or trusts from 1927 on).

The program's publicly stated purpose was the development and building of affordable housing, both rental and co-operatively owned, for middle-income residents. Under this program, local jurisdictions acquired property by eminent domain and provided it to developers to develop housing for low- and middle-income tenants.  Developers received tax abatements as long as they remained in the program, and low-interest mortgages, subsidized by the federal, state, or New York City government. They were also guaranteed a 6% or, later, 7.5% return on investment each year.  The program was based on the Morningside Gardens housing cooperative, a co-op in Manhattan's Morningside Heights neighborhood that was subsidized with tax money.

The New York State Division of Housing and Community Renewal (DHCR), was merged with the New York State Housing Finance Administration in 2010 to create the New York State Housing and Community Renewal agency.  The new agency provided financing, maintenance and supervision of mortgages to developments as long as they remained in the Mitchell–Lama program.

According to the New York State Homes and Community Renewal (formerly DHCR), "A total of 269 Mitchell-Lama developments with over 105,000 apartments were built under the program."

Removing properties 
Landlords generally may remove the developments from Mitchell–Lama by prepaying the mortgage, which usually happens 20 years after the project is developed. However, in some cases, special land use agreements specify more time. Between 1990 and 2005, Mitchell–Lama housing lost "22,688 units, over a third (34 percent) of its stock."  That pace has now increased with the real estate market for rental buildings. When a building is privatized, it loses its tax abatement, the owner generally must refinance the mortgage, and the owner loses the right to a 6% annual return on investment.

What happens to the tenants in those buildings depends on when they were built and public policy.

Rentals built before 1974 
Tenants in rental buildings built before 1974 go into rent stabilization upon leaving Mitchell–Lama. That means their rents increase according to the New York City Rent Guidelines Board orders for each new lease as well as according to orders by the New York Office of Rent Administration for, among other things, major capital improvements  and landlord hardship.

Rentals built since 1974 
Tenants who do not qualify for enhanced vouchers, including all tenants in post-1973 buildings that were not federally subsidized, must pay the rent set by the landlords. The buildings that are no longer in a rent-regulation program pose a particular problem for tenants who were receiving special subsidies such as subsidy programs because of poverty age, and disability.

Housing co-operatives 
After a certain period of years, owners of Mitchell–Lama limited equity housing co-operatives may decide according to their co-op voting rules to "privatize" or demutualize their building as well. That may permit owners to sell their apartments, often at a high profit, but it can potentially increase the maintenance fees of remaining residents since the building loses its tax abatement and may have increased payments for a non-subsidized mortgage. Flip taxes on resales can be used to mitigate such increases, but that is up to the co-op boards. There is some effort to require them by legislation, but that has so far been unsuccessful. Such demutualization thus simultaneously diminishes the stock of affordable housing in a given area and increases tax revenue.

Policy

Legislation 
Some politicians have proposed bills to the New York State legislature that would put all buildings leaving or that have left Mitchell–Lama into rent stabilization upon privatization. The Rent Act of 2011 signed into law on June 24, 2011, did not mention Mitchell–Lama rentals or co-operatives.

Division of Housing and Community Renewal lawsuit 
In November 2007, the State's Division of Housing and Community Renewal (DHCR) - now NYS HCR -  adopted regulations stating that just removing a pre-1974 Mitchell–Lama from the program is not a "unique or peculiar circumstance" justifying a substantial rent increase. Several landlords challenged that policy in court, asserting that it contradicts a court decision, KSLM-Columbus Apts. v. NYS DHCR, and a lower court's reference to DHCR policy letters.  Justice Schlesinger of the New York State Supreme Court ruled that the regulations are legal, and one of the owners (Steve Witkoff, owner of 95 W. 95th Street, now called "Columbus 95") appealed to the state's mid-level Appellate Division.  On December 28, 2010, the Appellate Division, First Department (covering the New York City boroughs of Manhattan and the Bronx) unanimously upheld DHCR's regulation.  The owner of Columbus 95 failed to pursue judicial permission to appeal to New York State's highest court.

See also
Riverside Park Community
Housing Development Fund Corporation

References

External links
 Affordable no more: New York City's Looming Crisis in Michell-Lama and Limited Dividend Housing
 2004 Annual Report - Mitchell-Lama Housing Companies in New York State

Housing in New York (state)
New York (state) law
Public housing in the United States
Rent regulation